Myakka River State Park is a Florida State Park, that is located  east of Interstate 75 in Sarasota County and a portion of southeastern Manatee County on the Atlantic coastal plain. It is also one of the oldest parks in the state. It was delineated in the 1930s by the Civilian Conservation Corps. A small portion of the park was the gift of the family of Bertha Palmer to the state. The park is named after the Myakka River.

Environment
Myakka River State Park is in the southeastern conifer forests ecoregion. Plant communities in areas of the park with drier soils are a mixture of pine forests, scrubby flatwoods, and dry prairies. Florida longleaf pine flatwoods are woodlands dominated by longleaf pine (Pinus palustris). South Florida pine flatwoods are open woodlands of (Pinus elliottii var. densa) with a dense ground cover of grasses and shrubs.  Florida dry prairies are flat, nearly treeless plains with dense cover of grasses, forbs, saw palmetto (Serenoa repens) and other low shrubs
.

Wetlands in the park include marshes and forested wetlands. Floridian highlands freshwater marshes are depression marshes composed of different herbaceous plant communities that vary based on water depth. Southern coastal plain nonriverine cypress domes are small wetlands of bald cypress (Taxodium distichum) notable for their dome-shaped appearance.

A karst sinkhole named Deep Hole is located on the northwest bank of the Myakka River in the Wilderness Preserve.

Rivers in the park support hammocks and floodplain forests. Near the floodplains of spring-fed rivers grow southern coastal plain hydric hammocks, dense forests of evergreen and deciduous hardwood trees. Blackwater rivers support southern coastal plain blackwater river floodplain forests of baldcypress along their banks.

Climate

Things to do 

The park is noted for its wildlife and some of the rare birds seen only in Florida, such as the roseate spoonbill, frequent the park. Native flora flourishes in the park. There are many species of fish, amphibians, reptiles, and mammals to learn about and enjoy watching as well.

Myakka River State Park has an excellent system of hiking trails. Walking trails crisscross the eastern side of the park.

Six primitive campgrounds are accessible by trail throughout the park: Mossy Hammock, Bee Island, Panther Point, Honore, Oak Grove and Prairie.

Horseback riding and biking is permitted on certain designated trails and roads in the park. This part of the park is dominated by expanses of very low vegetation, fields of palmetto, that make a transition to islands, or hammocks, of tall pine and oak trees.

A good portion of the park is accessible by automobile. Myakka River State Park's main road, a  drive between the north and south ends, leads visitors to a boardwalk out to the river and a lake that is excellent for bird watching.

The main drive is also popular with cyclists, runners, and skaters. Bicycle traffic can be heavy, especially on weekends and holidays.

A short walk from the main road reveals Myakka's canopy walkway, a novel suspension bridge and tower providing researchers and visitors with views of the forest canopy and a spectacular above-the-treetops view of the entire park.

Picnic areas, canoeing, boat tours, and developed campsites are available. The park even has five cabins that were built not with logs, but with the trunks of native sabal palms.

References

Gallery

External links 

 Myakka River State Park at Florida State Parks
 Friends of the Myakka River 
 Myakka River State Park at State Parks
 Myakka River State Park at Absolutely Florida
 Myakka River State Park at Visit Florida
 Myakka River State Park at Wildernet
 Myakka River Watershed - Florida DEP

Parks in Manatee County, Florida
Parks in Sarasota County, Florida
State parks of Florida
Civilian Conservation Corps in Florida
Protected areas established in 1941
1941 establishments in Florida
National Park Service Rustic architecture
National Park Service rustic in Florida